Bathytoma tuckeri is a species of sea snail, a marine gastropod mollusk in the family Borsoniidae.

References

 Vera-Pelaez. 2004, Contribution al conocimiento del genero Bathytoma Harris & Burrows, 1891 (Gastropoda, Turridae, Borsoniinae) en Japon, Taiwan y Filipinas con la description de tres especies nuevas;  Pliocenica, 4 : 107-125

tuckeri
Gastropods described in 2004